Sarah Spencer is an American musician. 

Sarah Spencer may also refer to:
 
Lady Sarah Spencer (1787–1870), wife of William Lyttelton, 3rd Baron Lyttelton; known as Sarah Lyttelton, Baroness Lyttelton
Sarah Spencer-Churchill (1865–1929), daughter of John Spencer-Churchill, 7th Duke of Marlborough; known as Sarah Wilson (war correspondent)
Sarah Spencer (born 1955), sister of Diana, Princess of Wales; known as Lady Sarah McCorquodale

See also
Sarah Spencer Washington (1889–1953), American beauty salon entrepreneur; America’s first black female millionaire
Lady Sarah (disambiguation)